Jarrad Paul Branthwaite (born 27 June 2002) is an English professional footballer who plays as a centre-back for Eredivisie club PSV, on loan from  club Everton.

Club career

Carlisle United 
Branthwaite made his first senior team bench appearance on 16 March 2019 in a 1–1 draw away to Forest Green Rovers. He appeared on the bench for seven more consecutive League Two matches that season.

Branthwaite started the 2019–20 season with 13 consecutive bench appearances in League Two matches, as well as making the bench in Carlisle United's 3–0 win over Barnsley and 2–1 loss to Rochdale in the first and second rounds of the 2019–20 EFL Cup. On 19 October, Branthwaite finally made his English Football League debut and started in a 2–0 League Two loss away to Plymouth Argyle, playing the full match and receiving a yellow card in the 40th minute. He scored his first professional goal for Carlisle when he scored in an EFL Trophy tie against Morecambe on 12 November.

Everton

2019–20 season 
On 13 January 2020, having enjoyed a breakthrough campaign at Carlisle, Branthwaite signed a two-and-a-half-year deal with Everton, keeping him at the club until the end of June 2022. He made his debut for the club on 12 July, coming on as a substitute for Leighton Baines in a 3–0 defeat against Wolverhampton Wanderers. He made his home debut against Aston Villa on 16 July, coming on as a substitute for the second straight game, this time for the injured Mason Holgate in the 16th minute. Branthwaite started his first game for Everton on 20 July against Sheffield United after signing an extended contract until June 2023, in which he was named man of the match in a 1–0 win for Everton.

2020–21 season: Loan to Blackburn Rovers 
On 14 January 2021, having only made one appearance for Everton in the EFL Cup, Branthwaite joined Championship club Blackburn Rovers on loan until the conclusion of the 2020–21 season. Two days later, he made his loan debut, starting and playing the full ninety minutes in a league game against Stoke City that finished 1–1. Branthwaite's season was ended prematurely on 21 April when he suffered an ankle injury during training. In total, he played in ten league games, all starts, for the Rovers, including nine straight after joining on loan.

2021–22 season: Return to Everton 
On 16 December 2021, Branthwaite made his first Premier League start of the season and scored his first Everton goal in a 1–1 away draw against Chelsea.

2022–23 season: Loan to PSV Eindhoven 
On 17 July 2022, Branthwaite joined Eredivisie club PSV on a season-long loan.

International career 
In November 2020, Branthwaite earned his first youth international call-up, being selected for the England U19 squad. 

In August 2021, Branthwaite received another international call-up, this time for the England U20 squad. On 6 September, Branthwaite made his debut for the U20s during a 6-1 victory over Romania U20s at St. George's Park. 

On 17 March 2023, Branthwaite received his first call up to the England U21s.

Career statistics

References 

2002 births
Footballers from Carlisle, Cumbria
Living people
English footballers
England youth international footballers
Association football defenders
Carlisle United F.C. players
Everton F.C. players
Blackburn Rovers F.C. players
PSV Eindhoven players
English Football League players
Premier League players
English expatriate footballers
Expatriate footballers in the Netherlands
English expatriate sportspeople in the Netherlands
Jong PSV players
Eredivisie players
Eerste Divisie players